Lingapalem is a village in Eluru district of the Indian state of Andhra Pradesh. The nearest railway station is at Eluru (EE) located at a distance of 28.1 Km.

Demographics
According to Indian census, 2011, the demographic details of Lingapalem is as follows:
 Total Population: 	2934 in 755 Households
 Male Population: 	1488 and Female Population: 	1446 (Sex ratio - 972)
 Children Under 6-years of age: 320 (Sex ratio - 882)
 Literacy rate: 	68.36 %

References 

Villages in Eluru district